"The Dead Brother's Song" is a Greek poem, considered to be the oldest surviving dimotikó, which are traditional Greek folk songs.

History
The song was composed in Asia Minor in the 9th century, during the time of the Byzantine Empire. 

The Dead Brother's Song was widespread in the Greek-speaking world during the High and Late Middle Ages, as it can be seen by the many variants that have survived in various places of Greece, of which seventeen were published in 1885. The song was adopted by the other Balkan literatures, notably by the Bulgarian and Serbian.

In 1962, Mikis Theodorakis composed a dramatic synthesis based on The Dead Brother's Song named The Ballad of the Dead Brother which referred to the Greek Civil War and the then oppressive political situation in Greece.

Structure
It is written in the meter called Political verse, iambic decapentasyllable (15 syllables), an evolution of the ancient Greek iambic trimeter (iambic dodecasyllable). It is not known whether it was actually set to music or it was merely a poem meant to be recited, as it only survives as a text.

Content
The main figures of the poem are Constantine and his sister Arete (which means "Virtue"), a name derived from the ancient Greek goddess Arete and the homonym for the excellent ideal. The presence of both is evident in the poem, as well as the presence of Charon.  The poem is called a παραλογή (paralogē, "illogic") as its theme is supernatural, featuring a dead person resurrecting for some time to fulfil an oath, and birds speaking with human voice.  Another well-known medieval paralogē is the song of the Bridge of Arta, a bridge whose foundations would not stand unless the master builder buried his own wife within the masonry.

References

External links
Mikis Theodorakis "The Ballad of the Dead Brother" - The Music
The Ballad of the Dead Brother, The Drama, by Gail Holst
 The Greek World of Folklore: The Dead Brother's Song
The Greek ballad text at wikisource 

Byzantine literature
Modern Greek literature
Greek folk songs